Amir Katz, born 1973 in Ramat Gan, Israel, is an Israeli German pianist. He began to play the piano at the age of 11 and won his first national competitions in Israel four years later. He received scholarships to study in Europe, including at the International Piano Foundation at Lake Como, where he had lessons with Leon Fleisher, Karl Ulrich Schnabel and Murray Perahia. These led him to Munich, Germany, where he finished his studies with Elisso Wirssaladse and Michael Schäfer.

Amir Katz has played all over the world, including at Alice Tully Hall New York, at the Théâtre du Châtelet Paris, at the Tonhalle Zurich, and in concert in Japan and China. Among the orchestras he has worked with are the Munich Philharmonic and the Israel Philharmonic, conducted by Zubin Mehta.

External links 
 Homepage of Amir Katz
 International Schubert Piano Competition

Israeli classical pianists
Cleveland International Piano Competition prize-winners
Israeli expatriates in Germany
1973 births
Living people
Jewish classical pianists
21st-century classical pianists
Oehms Classics artists